Arbuckle may refer to:

People
Arbuckle (surname)
William Arbuckle Reid (born 1933), British educationalist

Places

United Kingdom
Arbuckle railway station, Scotland

United States
Arbuckle, California
Arbuckle, Pennsylvania
Arbuckle, West Virginia
The Arbuckle Mountains, Oklahoma
Arbuckle Reservoir, Oklahoma
Fort Arbuckle (Oklahoma), Garvin County, Oklahoma
Fort Arbuckle (Florida)
Lake of the Arbuckles, Oklahoma
Old Fort Arbuckle, Tulsa County, Oklahoma

Other uses
Arbuckle (band), headed by musician and actor Danny Cooksey
Arbuckle, play by Cintra Wilson
Fatty Arbuckle's, restaurant chain in the UK
Iggy Arbuckle, fictional pig in an animated program of the same name
Moreland and Arbuckle, American blues duo
NQ Arbuckle, Canadian alternative country band
Jon Arbuckle, fictional character

See also
Arbuckle House (disambiguation)